Naftali Blumenthal (1 March 1922 – 1 May 2022) was an Israeli politician who served as a member of the Knesset for the Alignment from 1981 until 1984.

Biography
Born in Stanisławów in Poland (now Ivano-Frankivsk in Ukraine), Blumenthal made aliyah to Mandatory Palestine in 1934. He was a member of the Bnei Akiva youth movement and joined the Haganah at the age of 16. During the 1948 Arab–Israeli War, he served as a company commander in the Carmeli Brigade and was later demobilised with the rank of captain. He worked as an accountant, and joined Solel Boneh in 1951. In 1958 he became comptroller of the Industrial Section at Koor Industries, in 1965 became head of the Finances Section, and from 1977 until 1982 served as its general director.

Having joined Mapai in 1950, Blumenthal became the party's treasurer. After it merged into the Labor Party in 1968, he became a member of the new party's central committee, bureau and socio-economic committee. In 1981 he was elected to the Knesset on the list of the Alignment list, an alliance of the Labor Party and Mapam. He sat on the Finance Committee until losing his seat in the 1984 elections. In 1986, he became comptroller of the Histadrut.

Blumenthal died at the age of 100 on 1 May 2022.

References

External links

1922 births
2022 deaths
Ukrainian Jews
Polish emigrants to Mandatory Palestine
Jews in Mandatory Palestine
Israeli people of Ukrainian-Jewish descent
Alignment (Israel) politicians
Members of the 10th Knesset (1981–1984)
Israeli businesspeople
Haganah members
Israeli people of the 1948 Arab–Israeli War
Israeli centenarians
Men centenarians